North Klawatti Glacier lies in a cirque to the east of Austera Peak, North Cascades National Park, in the U.S. state of Washington. An arête divides North Klawatti Glacier from Klawatti Glacier to the south. In 1993, it had an area of 1.48 km2. The North Klawatti Glacier was one of four glaciers selected for glacier mass balance research. From 1993 (when monitoring began) to 2013 the glacier had lost ~8 m of thickness.

See also
List of glaciers in the United States

References

Glaciers of the North Cascades
Glaciers of Skagit County, Washington
Glaciers of Washington (state)